Willis Arnold Gorman (January 12, 1816 – May 20, 1876) was an American lawyer, soldier, politician, and a general in the Union Army during the American Civil War.

Biography
Gorman was born near Flemingsburg, Kentucky. He was the only child of David and Elizabeth Gorman, both of Irish descent. In 1835, the family moved to Bloomington, Indiana, where Gorman attended Indiana University and then established a law practice. In January 1836, he married Martha Stone in Bloomington. By 1837 he began his move into politics, becoming a clerk in the Indiana State Senate. From 1841 to 1844, he was elected to the Indiana House of Representatives.

In 1845 he returned to Indiana University and completed his law degree. In 1846 he volunteered for the army, enlisted as a private, and went to fight in the Mexican–American War. He was appointed as a major in the 3rd Indiana Volunteer Infantry, and led an independent rifle battalion at the Battle of Buena Vista, where he was severely wounded. When his term of service expired, he re-enlisted and was appointed colonel of the 4th Indiana. He served in the capture of Huamantla and in several other campaigns and battles under General Joseph Lane. In 1848 he was civil and military governor of Puebla, but soon after he returned to Indiana. He served in the United States House of Representatives from March 4, 1849, to March 3, 1853, as a representative of that state.

Gorman, politically a Democrat, served as the second Territorial Governor of Minnesota from May 15, 1853, to April 23, 1857, at the appointment of President Franklin Pierce. During his time as Governor of Minnesota, he masterminded an unsuccessful plan to move the capital of the territory from St. Paul to St. Peter, where he owned land that would have been eminently suitable for use as the new capitol grounds.  The plan was sidetracked when legislator Joe Rolette disappeared with the bill until the last seconds of the legislative session.

He spent a number of years practicing law in St. Paul, Minnesota, and served in the Minnesota House of Representatives from May 11, 1858, to January 1859.

With the secession of several Southern slave states, Gorman offered his services to the army. He was appointed Colonel of the 1st Minnesota Infantry, serving in the First Battle of Bull Run on July 21, 1861. On September 7, 1861, he was appointed brigadier general of volunteers and assigned to command a brigade in the II Corps in Army of the Potomac during the Peninsular Campaign. His troops suffered high casualties during the Battle of Antietam in an ill-fated attack on Confederate positions in the West Woods. Later in the year, he was assigned to command the District of Eastern Arkansas.

Postbellum
In 1864 he left the service and resumed his law practice in St. Paul. He was elected City attorney in 1869, and continued in that position until his death. He is buried in Oakland Cemetery in St. Paul.

See also

List of American Civil War generals (Union)

References

 Retrieved on 2008-02-14

 The   personal papers of Willis A. Gorman are available for research use at the Minnesota Historical Society.

External links
 

1816 births
1876 deaths
People from Flemingsburg, Kentucky
Indiana lawyers
Minnesota lawyers
American military personnel of the Mexican–American War
Governors of Minnesota Territory
Democratic Party members of the Indiana House of Representatives
Democratic Party members of the Minnesota House of Representatives
Union Army generals
United States Army officers
People of Minnesota in the American Civil War
American people of Irish descent
Indiana University Maurer School of Law alumni
Democratic Party members of the United States House of Representatives from Indiana
19th-century American politicians
19th-century American lawyers